Now and Ever is a 2019 Burmese romantic-drama film starring Zenn Kyi and Paing Phyo Thu. The film produced and distributed by Central Base Production premiered in Myanmar on October 31, 2019. The soundtrack of the film released on November 15, 2019.

Plot
Wutt Hmone and Thiha started met at Thiha father's clinic and soon they married. Wutt Hmone confused in her mind because of her mother's and her past. One day, due to the horrors of the past, she ran outside of home. Thiha searched her everywhere and found her at the police station. The truth was that Thiha had a secret. Dr. Myo Ko only knew about it. And Thiha took Wutt Hmone where she wanted to visit place, Putao. And then Thiha made Wutt Hmone think that he was having an adultery with Yoon Thandar to keep his secret. Finally, Wutt Hmone Knew about secret from Dr. Myo Ko.

Cast
Zenn Kyi as Thiha
Paing Phyo Thu as Wutt Hmone
Min Nyo as Dr. Myo Ko (Psychiatrist)
Khin Thazin as Yoon Thandar
Ju Jue K as mother of Wutt Hmone
Ye Naung Cho as father of Wutt Hmone
Zu Zue Honey Htwe (child actress) as young Wutt Hmone, young life of Wutt Hmone
Kyaw Thu

Soundtrack

The soundtrack of Now and Ever was distributed by Bo Bo Music Production. The music was composed by Zenn Kyi.

References

External links

2019 films
2010s Burmese-language films
Burmese romantic drama films
Films shot in Myanmar
2019 romantic drama films